Vjekoslav Kobešćak (born 20 January 1974) is a Croatian professional water polo coach and former player. He competed in the 1996, 2000 and 2004 Summer Olympics, representing the Croatia national team. He is currently the head coach of VK Jug.

His father Vlado is a former president of the Croatian Water Polo Federation, while his brother Dario is a former Croatian water polo player. He is married Antonia Kojan.

On 3 February 2000, Kobeščak was sentenced in Municipal Court in Croatia to a one year prison sentence. He was convicted of a serious traffic accident that happened on 6 November 1993, in which his passenger Marijana Matošin was killed.

Honours
Coach 
Jug Dubrovnik
 LEN Champions League (1): 2015–16
LEN Champions League runners-up: 2016–17
 LEN Super Cup (1): 2016
Adriatic League (3): 2015–16, 2016–17, 2017–18
 National Championship of Croatia (6): 2015–16, 2016–17, 2017–18, 2018–19, 2019-20, 2021-22
 National Cup of Croatia (5):2015-16,  2016-17, 2017-18, 2018-19,2022-23

Croatian  Supercup: 2022-23

See also
 List of Olympic medalists in water polo (men)

References

External links
 

1974 births
Living people
Sportspeople from Zagreb
Croatian male water polo players
Croatian water polo coaches
Olympic silver medalists for Croatia in water polo
Water polo players at the 1996 Summer Olympics
Water polo players at the 2000 Summer Olympics
Water polo players at the 2004 Summer Olympics
Medalists at the 1996 Summer Olympics
Sportspeople convicted of crimes